The 2017 6 Hours of Bahrain was an endurance sports car racing event held at the Bahrain International Circuit, Sakhir, Bahrain on 16–18 November 2017, and served as the ninth and last race of the 2017 FIA World Endurance Championship. Toyota's Anthony Davidson, Sébastien Buemi and Kazuki Nakajima won the race driving the No. 8 Toyota TS050 Hybrid. This was the last race of the Porsche 919 Hybrid. This would be the last time the race would be run in a 6 Hours format, with the race being extended to 8 hours for the 2019–20 FIA World Endurance Championship, after being absent from the 2018–19 FIA World Endurance Championship.

Qualifying

Qualifying result

Race

Race result

Class winners are denoted with a yellow background.

References

External links 
 

8 Hours of Bahrain
6 Hours of Bahrain
Bahrain
6 Hours of Bahrain